Moscatiello is a surname. Notable people with the surname include:

Carlo Moscatiello (1650–1739), Italian painter 
Lisa Moscatiello (born 1966), American singer 
Luca Moscatiello (born 1991), Italian footballer